The Cricket Captains' Walk is a collection of specially commissioned bronze busts of Test captains of the Australian men’s national cricket team, arrayed on pedestals on either side of a looping path set in a large public park in Cootamundra, New South Wales. The all-weather path, which starts and ends at Wallendoon Street is family, jogger, and wheelchair friendly, and approximately 250 metres long.

History
The Walk was planned and executed by the Cootamundra Shire Council (now Cootamundra–Gundagai Regional Council) with the approval of the Australian Cricket Board (now Cricket Australia).
Stage 1, unveiled on 30 August 1998, comprised the likenesses of Unaarrimin (Johnny Mullagh),  Dave Gregory, Bill Murdoch, Arthur Morris,  Richie Benaud, Bobby Simpson, Bill Lawry,  Ian Chappell,  Greg Chappell,  Allan Border and Mark Taylor. Modelling of these busts was performed by Carl Valerius, sculptor and stone mason of Harden–Murrumburrah, perhaps best known for his bronze statues at the Australian Light Horse Memorial in Harden–Murrumburrah, notably the horse "Bill the Bastard", of which the full size version is now installed at Harden-Murrumburrah.
The nearby statue by Valerius (shown below) of Bradman in action was unveiled during the celebrations for "Sir Don"'s 92nd Birthday in August 2000.
A minor mystery surrounds the Brian Booth sculpture, similar in style to others by Valerius, but not credited in the official documentation. There is no obvious clue in the plaques, which have been commendably uniform in style and execution over 30 years.
Stage 2, comprising the remaining 30 captains, was unveiled by the sculptor Tom Bass on 27 August 2008, the centenary of Bradman's birth barely a kilometre away. Much of this work was performed by Bass and his team. His bust of Bradman was unveiled by the cricketer's grandson, Tom Bradman.
Stage 3, unveiled on 12 March 2020, brought the walk up-to-date with the unveiling of three new busts - Shane Watson, Steve Smith and Tim Paine and a plaque for Michael Clarke, who was mid-career when the second tranche of busts was commissioned. All three were made by the Tom Bass sculpture studio.

The busts
For a more complete summary of each captaincy, see List of Australia national cricket captains.

Gallery

See also
List of Australia national cricket captains

References 

1998 establishments in Australia
Lists of Australian cricketers
Sculpture gardens, trails and parks in Australia
Parks in New South Wales